Kirill Nikolayevich Rybakov (born 11 May 1969) is a former Russian professional footballer.

Club career
He made his professional debut in the Soviet Top League in 1989 for FC Lokomotiv Moscow. He played 1 game in the 1993–94 UEFA Cup for FC Dynamo Moscow.

Honours
 Russian Premier League runner-up: 1994.
 Russian Premier League bronze: 1993.
 Moldovan National Division champion: 1999.
 Russian Cup winner: 1995.
 Soviet Cup finalist: 1990.

External links
 

1969 births
Footballers from Moscow
Living people
Soviet footballers
Russian footballers
Russian expatriate footballers
Expatriate footballers in Poland
Expatriate footballers in Moldova
Expatriate footballers in Belarus
Russian expatriate sportspeople in Moldova
Russian expatriate sportspeople in Poland
Russian Premier League players
FC Dynamo Moscow reserves players
FC Lokomotiv Moscow players
FC Asmaral Moscow players
FC Dynamo Moscow players
OKS Stomil Olsztyn players
FC Zimbru Chișinău players
FC Khimki players
FC Slavia Mozyr players
Association football forwards